Karl Stangl (born 1 November 1930) is an Austrian sailor. He competed in the Dragon event at the 1972 Summer Olympics.

References

External links
 

1930 births
Living people
Austrian male sailors (sport)
Olympic sailors of Austria
Sailors at the 1972 Summer Olympics – Dragon
Place of birth missing (living people)